Kurtsuyu is a village in Mut district of Mersin Province, Turkey. It is in the valley of Göksu River in Toros Mountains. At  it is to situated by the small creek Kurtsuyu which flows to Göksu River. It is also on the Turkish state highway  . The population of Kurtsuyu was 145 as of 2012. The major economic activity of the village is agriculture. Olive, apricot and figs are the main crops.

References

Villages in Mut District